The 1928 UCI Track Cycling World Championships were the World Championship for track cycling. They took place in Budapest, Hungary from 11 to 18 August 1928. Three events for men were contested, two for professionals and one for amateurs.

Medal summary

Medal table

See also
 1928 UCI Road World Championships

References

Track cycling
UCI Track Cycling World Championships by year
International cycle races hosted by Hungary
International sports competitions in Budapest
1928 in track cycling